The 2011–12 California Golden Bears men's basketball team represented the University of California, Berkeley in the 2011–12 NCAA Division I men's basketball season. This was head coach Mike Montgomery's fourth season at California. The Golden Bears played their home games at Haas Pavilion and were members of the Pac-12 Conference. They finished with a record of 24–10 overall, 13–5 in Pac-12 play. They lost in the semifinals of the 2012 Pac-12 Conference men's basketball tournament to Colorado. They earned a 12th seed at the 2012 NCAA Division I men's basketball tournament which they lost in the First Four to South Florida.

Roster

Coaching staff

Schedule and results
Source
All times are Pacific

|-                                               
!colspan=9 style=|Exhibition

|-
!colspan=9 style=|Regular Season

|-
!colspan=9 style=| Pac-12 Tournament

|-
!colspan=9 style=| NCAA Tournament

Notes
 March 5, 2012 – Senior guard Jorge Gutierrez was named the 2011–12 Pac-12 Men's Basketball Player of the Year and Pac-12 Defensive Player of the Year.

References

External links
CalBears.com 

California
California Golden Bears men's basketball seasons
California
California Golden Bears men's basketball
California Golden Bears men's basketball